Fantastic Voyage: The Greatest Hits is a compilation album by rapper Coolio, released in 2001. It includes the track "Aw Here it Goes," the main theme to TV series Kenan & Kel. Other songs originally appeared on his first three albums, It Takes a Thief, Gangsta's Paradise and My Soul.

Track listing
"Fantastic Voyage"
"Gangsta's Paradise"
"C U When U Get There"
"Too Hot"
"Aw Here it Goes (Theme from Kenan & Kel)"
"Ooh la La"
"I Remember"
"1, 2, 3, 4 (Sumpin' New)"
"Hit Em"
"Mama I'm in Love Wit a Gangsta"
"My Soul"
"County Line"
"Geto Highlights"

References

Coolio albums
2001 compilation albums
Tommy Boy Records compilation albums
G-funk compilation albums